Polona Frelih (born 3 September 1970) is a Slovenian table tennis player. She competed in the women's singles event at the 1992 Summer Olympics.

References

External links
 

1970 births
Living people
Slovenian female table tennis players
Olympic table tennis players of Slovenia
Table tennis players at the 1992 Summer Olympics
Sportspeople from Ljubljana